Gibbaeum dispar is a plant species in the family Aizoaceae, native to South Africa. It grows close to the ground and has short stems, causing it to grow in clumps.

References

dispar
Taxa named by N. E. Brown